The England cricket team toured Australia during the 2013–14 season from 31 October 2013 to 2 February 2014. The series included the traditional five Tests for The Ashes, and also featured five One Day Internationals (ODIs) and three T20 Internationals (T20Is).

Australia dominated all three formats on the tour, their only loss coming in the fourth ODI. As a result of the tour, England's Test coach Andy Flower was relieved of his duties with the team, while batsman Kevin Pietersen was informed that he would no longer be considered for selection by the national team.

Squads

±Late addition

Background
The two teams were meeting after a gap of less than six months. These back to back Ashes series were being staged after 38 years, reminiscent of the 1970s. The move was initiated keeping in mind the 2015 World Cup that Australia and New Zealand were to host. The previous edition of the Ashes was played in England in July 2013 with England emerging comfortable winners. England had won the previous three editions of the Ashes and were tipped to win this edition as well. They were looking to emulate a feat that had not been achieved since the 1890s, win four Ashes on the trot. Simply going by Australia's performances in the recent past, it was assumed that the result was a foregone conclusion. Australia's batting was clearly found wanting in the previous series and they had lost matches from seemingly comfortable situations, as was seen in Durham and Lord's. The series had was also shadowed by the controversy surrounding Stuart Broad's refusal to walk in the previous series after clearly edging Ashton Agar to Michael Clarke in the first test at Trent Bridge. He was dubbed a "smug, pommie cheat" by sections of the media and with coach Darren Lehman's unsavory comments, things were even more interesting.

Tour matches

First-class: Western Australia Chairman's XI v England XI

The England team arrived in Australia in late October looking to get the tour off to a good start, but the Chairman's XI were more than a match for them. Chris Lynn was loaned to Western Australia by Queensland, overlooked for their Sheffield Shield clash being played at the same time. This move paid off as Lynn made a blistering 104, only his third first-class century as each of Western Australia's top four batsmen made half-centuries. England's fast-bowling trio of Chris Tremlett, Boyd Rankin and Steven Finn struggled for line and length on the WACA wicket and Chairman's XI declared at 5/451. England began to fight back however as Michael Carberry made 78 and both Jonathan Trott and Ian Bell made centuries, the former didn't get out and made 113 and the latter retired on 115. England were eventually bowled out for 391 and half-centuries to Mitchell Marsh and Lynn meant that the game ended in a draw.

First-class: Australia A v England XI

England turned things around against Australia A as the tourists piled on the runs. Australia A were luckless in the field as England's Michael Carberry and captain Alastair Cook each made 150 as England finished the first day on 318 without loss. The rain was relentless on Days 2 and 3, meaning no play was possible and the game was headed for a certain draw. Both Cook and Carberry retired ahead of Day 4, when Joe Root made 58 and Ben Cutting was the pick of the bowlers. England finally put Australia A out of their misery and declared at 7/430. Only 31 overs were bowled as Alex Doolan made 31 as another tour match went down as a draw.

First-class: Cricket Australia Invitational XI v England XI

England were dominant early on against the Invitational XI taking 5/93 in just over 30 overs. Ed Cowan provided the only resistance with 51, until the New South Wales duo of Ryan Carters and Peter Nevill fought back with 94 and 83, respectively. The partnership was broken on Day 2 and the visitors were left chasing 304. They passed the total easily as Cook, Trott, Kevin Pietersen and Root all made half-centuries, despite James Muirhead's four wickets. Aaron Finch made a half-century as his side made 261 leaving England with 148 to win and Carberry's fifty ensured that England won by seven wickets.

Two-day: Cricket Australia Chairman's XI v England XI

After losing the first test at The Gabba, the England side headed to Traeger Park in Alice Springs for a two-day game against the Cricket Australia Chairman's XI. In what proved to be a rough first day for England, Gary Ballance was the only man to pass 50 as the tourists made a modest 7/212 before declaring. Steven Cazzulino and Marcus Harris both fell short of half-centuries as the Chairman's XI declared at 8/254. England batted for only 16 more overs for 1/47, of which Carberry made 37 as yet another tour match finished in a draw.

50-over: Prime Minister's XI v England XI

Former Australia fast bowler Brett Lee was chosen to captain the Prime Minister's XI. This was substantiated as the 37-year-old took the wicket of England captain Alastair Cook. Gary Ballance and Jos Buttler both scored fifties as England made their way to 264. The England bowlers did the rest of the work, led by Ravi Bopara. Brad Hodge and ACT batsman Michael Spaseski provided the only resistance as the Prime Ministers' XI were bundled out for just 92.

Test series

First Test

Second Test

Third Test

Fourth Test

Fifth Test

Statistics

Batting
Most runs

Bowling
Most wickets

ODI series

1st ODI

England lost early wickets but Gary Ballance and Eoin Morgan both made half-centuries to steady the ship as England made 269. A 163 run-partnership between David Warner and Aaron Finch, during which the latter became the first Victorian to score an ODI hundred at the MCG, helped Australia cruise to a six-wicket win with 26 balls to spare.

2nd ODI

A remarkable match began well for the tourists. Ian Bell made a half-century, but Jos Buttler fell one short. The English continued to score frequently and Eoin Morgan blasted 106 as England reached 300. The Australians responded well, both Shaun Marsh and Glenn Maxwell scored fifties, but the Australians collapsed to 9/244 and a comeback seemed unlikely, with Australia requiring 57 runs in 6 overs with only one wicket in hand. However, James Faulkner, aided by tail-ender Clint McKay, calmly backed himself to find the required boundaries, which he did with regularity as he smashed the required 57 to carry Australia to a heart-stopping one-wicket victory with three balls to spare.

3rd ODI

Alastair Cook's side won the toss on a pitch favouring the side batting first and made a swift start, yet were slowed down due to Australia's good bowling and fielding. Eoin Morgan was the only batsman to pass 50 for the tourists, his innings cut short by a return catch by Dan Christian amid some controversy. Although no Australian batsman made a hundred, fifties to David Warner and Shaun Marsh meant Australia finished with a seven-wicket victory to take an unassailable 3–0 lead in the series.

4th ODI

On the 91st day of the tour, England finally beat Australia for the first and only time on the tour. Cook made 44, Buttler hit 71, 55 from Bell as well as 70 from Ben Stokes helped England reach 316. Despite 108 from Aaron Finch, the Australian chase was unsuccessful as England won by 57 runs.

5th ODI

Australia started slowly, falling to 4/64 before a score of 56 from George Bailey helped them to 217 all out. Cook, Root and Morgan all scored well to take England close, but Ravi Bopara was unable to bring the team to victory, falling victim to an odd stumping by Matthew Wade, as the Australians won the game and the series.

Statistics

Batting
Most runs

Bowling
Most wickets

T20I series

1st T20I

A 106-run partnership set the tone for Australia's dominance as Aaron Finch made 52 and a returning Cameron White made 75. Debutant Chris Lynn smashed 33 as the Australians reached 213 from their 20 overs. England lost wickets frequently and a quick-fire 65 from Ravi Bopara wasn't enough to prevent Australia from winning the game by 13 runs.

2nd T20I

Good bowling from Josh Hazlewood and defensive fielding meant England could only reach 130, thanks in part to Jos Buttler, who top-scored with just 22. Cameron White again put on a show with 58 and Australia's captain George Bailey hit 60 to ensure the target was reached in less than 15 overs.

3rd T20I

Once again, Cameron White scored quickly and made 41 as cameos from Aaron Finch, Ben Cutting and 49 from George Bailey ensured the Australians made a big total of 195. 34 from Eoin Morgan was the only highlight for England as they slumped to just 111 giving the Australians a 3–0 series victory.

References

External links
English cricket team in Australia in 2013–14 at ESPNcricinfo

England 2013-14
2013-14
2013-14
International cricket competitions in 2013–14